Great Flood of 1927 may refer to:

 Great Mississippi Flood of 1927
 Great Vermont Flood of 1927